Awareness International School is located in New Baneshwor, Kathmandu, Nepal and schools over 600 students. Established in 2006, the school is a competitive institution of Kathmandu. It offers education from kindergarten through School Leaving Certificate levels with ten SLC batches passed with excellent results.

References

External links 
 

Schools in Kathmandu
2006 establishments in Nepal